is a 2018 Japanese film directed by Kojiro Hashimoto and starring Kento Yamazaki. Based on the 2016 award-winning Booksellers novel Hitsuji to Hagane no Mori by Natsu Miyashita, which tell the story about Tomura's ambition to become a piano tuner. An English translation of Miyashita's novel is due for release in April 2019.

Plot
When in high school, Naoki Tomura watched a piano tuner, Soichiro Itadori, work on the school piano. He could smell the forest from the piano tuning by Soichiro. When he graduated he worked at the music instrument store where Soichiro works.

Cast
 Kento Yamazaki as Naoki Tomura 
 Tomokazu Miura as Soichiro Itadori 
 Mone Kamishiraishi as Kazune Sakura 
 Moka Kamishiraishi as Yuni Sakura 
 Ryohei Suzuki as Shinji Yanagi 
 Yuu Shirota as Masato Kamijyo 
 Hayato Sano as Masaki Tomura 
 Keiko Horiuchi as Mizuki Kitakawa 
 Ken Mitsuishi as Tadashi Akino 
 Riisa Naka as Eri Hamano 
 Yuki Morinaga as Takashi Minami 
 Kazuko Yoshiyuki as Kiyo Tomura

Awards

References

External links
 

2018 films
Toho films
Films based on Japanese novels
Japanese drama films
Synesthesia
2010s Japanese films
2010s Japanese-language films